Kennedy Shahid Bwibo (born 15 May 1968) is a former Kenyan cricketer whose single list-A appearance for the Kenyan national side came in March 1997.

Born in Nairobi, Bwibo's club cricket was played for the Sir Ali Muslim Club. Described by a CricInfo writer as a "burly right arm opening bowler", his best performance at that level was 8/28. Bwibo's sole high-level match for Kenya came during the 1996–97 South African season, when the team participated in the Standard Bank Cup (a limited overs interprovincial knockout tournament). Kenya were drawn against Natal in its quarter-final, and were knocked out of the tournament after losing by 104 runs. Bowling second-change behind Martin Suji, Thomas Odoyo, and Tony Suji, Bwibo conceded 13 runs from his two overs, with Natal's batting line-up featuring South African national side players Andrew Hudson, Pat Symcox, Jonty Rhodes, Shaun Pollock, and Lance Klusener. After the conclusion of his playing career, Bwibo became involved in coaching. For the 2008 edition of the Sahara Elite League (what was to be the first and only edition of the competition), he was named coach of the Eastern Aces franchise, which was captained by Steve Tikolo.

References

External links

1968 births
Kenyan cricket coaches
Kenyan cricketers
Living people
People from Nairobi